Thomas Jefferson Smith (born 31 March 1990) is a professional footballer who plays as a defender for   club Colchester United. Born in England, he represents the New Zealand national team.

A graduate of the Ipswich Town academy, he plays primarily as a centre back, but can also play as a left back. Smith spent 11 years at Ipswich, making over 240 appearances before leaving in January 2018 to join MLS side Colorado Rapids. He later joined Sunderland in February 2020 after being released by Colorado. Later in 2020, he signed for Colchester United.

Club career

Ipswich Town
Born in Macclesfield, Cheshire, Smith is a product of the Ipswich Town academy. He won the club's Young Player of the Year award for the 2006–07 season. He signed a three-year professional contract in August 2007. He was on the shortlist for the 2008 Wickes Young Apprentice Trophy, given to the best youth player in the Championship, but Mark Beevers won the award.

Stevenage Borough (loan)
In February 2008, Smith joined Stevenage Borough in the Conference National on a one-month emergency loan. He made his debut for the club on 23 February in a 0–0 draw with Grays Athletic. Later the loan was extended until the end of the season. He played 15 games for the club before returning to Ipswich.

Return to Ipswich
Smith's form for Stevenage led to him getting his opportunity in the Ipswich first-team, he made his debut on 9 August 2008, in a 1–2 home loss to Preston North End at Portman Road.

That season, Smith broke his ankle in training, and missed the majority of the season. However, by the time he made his return to first team action, manager Jim Magilton had left the club and been replaced by Roy Keane. Smith featured heavily in Keane's early games as Ipswich manager, with the former Manchester United midfielder opting to give some of the club's younger talent – such as Connor Wickham and Smith – a chance to prove themselves.

However, injury stalled Smith's progress once again, when he suffered another training ground injury – this time to his hand. In his absence Gareth McAuley and Damien Delaney formed a solid defensive partnership ahead of deputizing goalkeeper Arran Lee-Barrett. Smith was unable to force his way back into the first team in the short-term.

Brentford (loan)
On 7 January 2010, Smith joined Brentford on a temporary basis. In doing so, Smith replaced Pim Balkestein at Griffin Park, who had been on loan at the club from Ipswich too. He made his debut on 16 January in a 3–1 win over Carlisle United. Smith played eight games during his brief spell at Brentford, before being recalled by Ipswich on 15 March.

Return to Ipswich
Smith scored his first professional goal for Ipswich away against Middlesbrough in the first game of the 2010–11 Championship season, which Ipswich won 3–1. He made 26 appearances over the course of the season, scoring 3 goals.

Colchester United (loan)
On 17 March 2011, Smith signed for Colchester United on loan for the rest of the 2010–11 season. He made his debut two days later in a 0–1 away loss to Tranmere Rovers. He made 6 appearances during his loan spell before returning to Ipswich.

Return to Ipswich
After an impressive 2011–12 season, in which he scored 3 goals in 28 appearances, Smith signed a two-year contract extension in May 2012.

He scored in his first appearance of the 2012–13 season in a 3–1 home win over Bristol Rovers at Portman Road in a League Cup first round tie, on 14 August. He established himself as a first-team starter over the course of the season, making 41 appearances in all competitions and scoring 4 goals. Smith's performances earned him the Ipswich Town Player of the Year award for the season.

Smith formed a strong defensive partnership with new signing Christophe Berra during the 2013–14 season. He scored his first goal of the season on 10 August, in a 3–0 home win over Millwall. He made 47 appearances during the season, scoring 6 goals, his highest goal return in a season to date.

He continued to feature as a first-team regular during the 2014–15 season as Ipswich finished 6th and qualified for the Championship play-offs. He played 46 games over the course of the season, scoring 5 goals, including scoring against Norwich City in an East Anglian Derby on 16 May 2015.

He scored his first goal of the 2015–16 season on 15 August, netting the winner in a 2–1 home win over Sheffield Wednesday at Portman Road. He scored his second goal of the season on 15 September, scoring the winning goal in a 0–1 away win over Leeds United at Elland Road. He made a total of 48 appearances during the season, scoring 2 goals.

Injury hampered Smith's 2016–17 season, on 16 September he was ruled out for 12 weeks due to a back injury. He continued to suffer with injury over the course of the season, making just 11 appearances during the campaign.

He continued to suffer injury problems during the 2017–18 season, he made his first appearance of the season on the opening day 1–0 win over Birmingham City, but only made a further 2 appearances between August and January. On 6 January 2018 it was reported that Smith was close to joining Major League Soccer side Colorado Rapids.

Colorado Rapids
On 22 January 2018, Smith signed with Colorado Rapids. He made his debut for the club on 21 February, in a 0–2 loss to Toronto FC in a CONCACAF Champions League tie. He scored his first goal for the club on 14 June 2018 in a 2–2 draw with Chicago Fire. During a match against Minnesota United on 13 October 2018, he partially provoked a brawl after the team scored their second goal. He was red carded as a result. He made 36 appearances during his first season at the club, scoring 4 goals, including late winners over Minnesota United and Dallas.

He scored in the opening game of the 2019 season in a 2–1 loss to Dallas. He went on to make a total of 28 appearances over the course of the season, netting 3 goals.

On 22 November 2019 it was announced by the Rapids that they had declined the contract options for Smith to stay with the club.

Following his release from Colorado, Smith returned to England and began training with former club Ipswich, leading to speculation of a return to his former club. However, manager Paul Lambert ruled out the possibility of Smith returning to the club.

Sunderland
On 21 February 2020, Smith joined League One club Sunderland on a contract until the end of the season. Due to early suspension of the 2019–20 season due to the outbreak of the Coronavirus he did not make an appearance for the club. He left Sunderland at the end of the season following the end of his short-term contract.

Colchester United
On 25 August 2020, Smith joined League Two side Colchester United on a two year deal. He had previously appeared for Colchester on loan from Ipswich during the 2010–11 season and had featured in a number of Colchester's 2020–21 pre-season friendlies. He made his second debut for the club on 5 September 2020 in Colchester's 3–1 EFL Cup defeat to Reading. He scored his first goal for the club in their 2–1 win over Grimsby Town on 5 December 2020.

On 5 July 2021, Smith signed a two-year contract extension with the club. He was named club captain ahead of the 2021–22 season.

International career
Born in England, Smith resided in New Zealand during his youth and as a result holds dual nationality. This gave him the opportunity to declare himself eligible for the New Zealand national football team ("All Whites"), though he has also represented England at U-17 and U-18 level. Smith played in the 2007 FIFA U-17 World Cup in Korea during September 2007 despite not playing a part in England's qualification for the tournament.

In December 2009, after the New Zealand national football team had qualified for the 2010 FIFA World Cup, Smith declared that he wanted to play for New Zealand and made himself available for All Whites selection, having been offered the opportunity by the Kiwi's boss, Ricki Herbert. He made his full international debut on 3 March 2010, starting in a 2–0 friendly defeat to Mexico in Los Angeles, USA on 3 March 2010. Smith was named in New Zealand's final 23-man squad to compete at the 2010 FIFA World Cup and made his first World Cup Finals appearance in New Zealand's opening game, a 1–1 draw against Slovakia. He also went on play every minute of New Zealand's World Cup campaign, which achieved a historic three points at the tournament.

Smith became the youngest captain in All Whites history after leading the team in a 2–2 draw versus El Salvador on 23 May 2012. On 2 June 2012, Smith scored his first goal for his country in 1–0 win versus Fiji in a 2014 FIFA World Cup Qualifier. He represented New Zealand at the 2012 Summer Olympics, playing in all 3 of New Zealand's games. In May 2016, coach Anthony Hudson suggested Smith would not be called up for the national team in the future, citing a perceived lack of commitment.

Career statistics

Club

International

International goals
As of match played 22 March 2013. New Zealand score listed first, "score" column indicates score after each Smith goal.

Honours
Individual
Ipswich Town Young Player of the Year: 2006–07
Ipswich Town Player of the Year: 2012–13
IFFHS OFC Men's Team of the Decade 2011–2020
IFFHS Oceania Men's Team of All Time: 2021

See also
 List of New Zealand international footballers

References

External links

1990 births
Living people
Sportspeople from Macclesfield
English footballers
New Zealand association footballers
Association football defenders
Ipswich Town F.C. players
Stevenage F.C. players
Brentford F.C. players
Colchester United F.C. players
Colorado Rapids players
Sunderland A.F.C. players
English Football League players
National League (English football) players
Major League Soccer players
England youth international footballers
Olympic association footballers of New Zealand
New Zealand international footballers
2010 FIFA World Cup players
2012 OFC Nations Cup players
Footballers at the 2012 Summer Olympics
2017 FIFA Confederations Cup players
English emigrants to New Zealand
English expatriate footballers
New Zealand expatriate association footballers
English expatriate sportspeople in the United States
New Zealand expatriate sportspeople in the United States
Expatriate soccer players in the United States